Henry Black (February 25, 1783 – November 28, 1841) was a Whig member of the U.S. House of Representatives from Pennsylvania.

Early life
Henry Black was born near the borough of Somerset, Pennsylvania.  He engaged in agricultural pursuits.

Pennsylvania House of Representatives
He served as a member of the Pennsylvania House of Representatives from 1816 to 1818.  He was elected as a Democrat in 1816. He was a justice of the peace and appointed by the Governor of Pennsylvania as an associate judge of Somerset County, Pennsylvania, from 1820 to 1840.

Electoral Tickets
Black was on the People's Ticket (electoral ticket) for the Election of 1828, in the 13th district (John Quincy Adams for President and Richard Rush for Vice President).  He was also on the Whig Electoral Ticket for the 24th district in the Election of 1840.

United States House of Representatives
Black was elected as a Whig to the Twenty-seventh Congress to fill the vacancy caused by the death of Charles Ogle.  The election was held on Tuesday, June 8, 1841. The vote for Black was approximately 2,703 with the opposition (party not named) getting 1,320 votes (Black receiving a majority of 1,383 more votes).  The Daily Atlas lists the opposition candidate's name as "Pilson".  (However, the same newspaper listed a "Mr. Philson of Somerset" as the opponent in the special election to replace Black after his death.)

Death
Black served in the House of Representatives until his death at his residence in Somerset in 1841.  The cause of death was apoplexy.

Memorials
Interment in the family cemetery in Stonycreek Township, Somerset County, Pennsylvania.  Cenotaph at Congressional Cemetery in Washington, D.C.

On Thursday, December 9, 1841, his colleague Representative Joseph Lawrence took to the House floor to announce Black's death and provide a eulogy.  Lawrence stated that Black was well liked by anyone who came into contact with him.  Lawrence indicated that Black was his childhood friend.  Lawrence also stated that Black had been in good health the day before his death.  Lawrence then submitted a resolution that crepe should be worn in honor of Black's death.  The resolution was adopted.

According to the Philadelphia U.S. Gazette (reprinted in the Easton Gazette), he was virtuous and well liked.

Descendants
His son was Attorney General Jeremiah S. Black and his grandson was Pennsylvania Lt. Governor Chauncey Forward Black.

See also
List of United States Congress members who died in office (1790–1899)

References

The Political Graveyard

Sources

1783 births
1841 deaths
Members of the Pennsylvania House of Representatives
People from Somerset County, Pennsylvania
Pennsylvania state court judges
Burials at the Congressional Cemetery
Whig Party members of the United States House of Representatives from Pennsylvania
19th-century American politicians
19th-century American judges